Paul Victor Marshall (born 1947) is an American author and prelate, who served as Bishop of Bethlehem from June 29, 1996 to December 31, 2013.

Biography
Marshall was born in 1947 in New York City and was raised in Lancaster County, Pennsylvania. He grew up in the Lutheran Church–Missouri Synod and was ordained as a pastor in the church. For around 20 years he served Lutheran congregations in Connecticut, New York, Wisconsin and Minnesota. Between 1972 and 1977 he served as a chaplain in the US Army, after which he joined the Episcopal Church and was ordained deacon and priest in 1978 for the Diocese of Fond du Lac.

He earned his Doctor of Theology from General Theological Seminary in 1982, where he was a Fellow and Lecturer in Homiletics, Latin and Liturgics between 1979 and 1982. Between 1979 and 1982 he served as assistant at Holy Trinity Church in Long Island, New York, after which he became rector of Christ Church in Babylon, New York. Subsequently, he was also professor of Liturgics and Homiletics and chaplain at the George Mercer School of Theology in Garden City, New York. In 1989 he became an associate professor at Yale Divinity School.

On December 2, 1995, Marshall was elected as the eighth Bishop of Bethlehem on the third ballot during the diocesan convention. He was consecrated on June 29, 1996 by Bishop Robert D. Rowley of Northwestern Pennsylvania, and co-consecrated by Mark Dyer and Lloyd E. Gressle, both former Bishops of Bethlehem, in St Stephen's Pro-Cathedral, Wilkes-Barre, Pennsylvania.  He retired on December 31, 2013. Since the 1970s and continuing to the 2020s, the Episcopal Diocese of Bethlehem has been a significant epicenter of local underage sexual abuse and clergy complaints in both the Episcopal Church and the Roman Catholic Church.

Bibliography 
Preaching for the Church Today: The Skills, Prayer, and Art of Sermon Preparation 
Prayer Book Parallels (New York: Church Publishing, 2000)
One, Catholic, and Apostolic (New York: Church Publishing, 2004)

References

Living people
1947 births
American Episcopalians
Converts to Anglicanism from Lutheranism
Episcopal bishops of Bethlehem